Likoma Islands is a constituency for the National Assembly of Malawi, located in the Likoma District of Malawi's Northern Region. It elects one Member of Parliament by the first past the post system. The constituency is currently represented by DPP MP George Kamwanja.

Election results

References

Constituencies of the National Assembly of Malawi